Žiri ( or ; formerly also Žir, locally Žier) is a town in northwestern Slovenia. It is the administrative centre of the Municipality of Žiri, created in 1994. Prior to this the town belonged administratively to the area of Škofja Loka.

Location
The town of Žiri lies in the extreme southwest part of the Upper Carniola region on the borders with the Inner Carniola and the Littoral regions in the Žiri Basin at the end of the Poljane Valley. A number of tributaries join there to become the Poljane Sora.

Name

The name of the settlement was first attested in 1291 as Syroch (and as Seyroch in 1307 and Syroch in 1318). It is probably derived from a plural form of the hypocorism *Žirъ, and the name would therefore mean 'Žir and his people'. An alternative, less likely theory, connects the name to the Slovene common noun žir 'beech nuts'.

An Austrian post office was established in Žiri in 1871 under the name Sairach, district of Loitsch (Logatec). The Slovene name was added to the postal name at the end of the 19th century.

Church
The parish church in the town of Žiri is dedicated to Saint Martin and belongs to the Archdiocese of Ljubljana.

Notable people
Notable people that were born or lived in Žiri include:
Leopold Suhodolčan (1928–1980), writer

References

External links

 Žiri at Geopedia

Populated places in the Municipality of Žiri
Cities and towns in Upper Carniola